Bacillus virus AP50 is a species of bacteriophage that infects Bacillus anthracis bacteria. Originally thought to be an RNA phage, it contains a DNA genome of about 14,000 base pairs in an icosahedral capsid with a two-layer capsid shell.

References

Bacillus phages
Bacteriophages
Tectiviridae